Puncturella  larva is a species of sea snail, a marine gastropod mollusk in the family Fissurellidae, the keyhole limpets and slit limpets.

Description
The size of the shell reaches 3 mm.

Distribution
This species occurs in the Atlantic Ocean off Georgia, USA.

References

External links
 Dall W. H. (1927). Small shells from dredgings off the southeast coast of the United states by the United States Fisheries Steamer "Albatross", in 1885 and 1886. Proceedings of the United States National Museum, 70(18): 1-134
 To Encyclopedia of Life
 To World Register of Marine Species

Fissurellidae
Gastropods described in 1927